Bojanov is a market town in Chrudim District in the Pardubice Region of the Czech Republic. It has about 600 inhabitants.

Administrative parts

Villages of Holín, Horní Bezděkov, Hořelec, Hrbokov, Hůrka, Kovářov and Petrkov are administrative parts of Bojanov.

Geography
It lies in the Iron Mountains. The river Chrudimka flows through the territory.

History
Bojanov is one of the oldest settlements in the Iron Mountains area. The first written mention of the settlement is from 1126, when it belonged to the monastery in Vilémov. From 1329 it became a part of Lichnice Castle estate owned by Jindřich of Lichtemberk. In the 15th century, Bojanov belonged to the Oheb Castle. In 1564, Bojanov is referred to as a market town for the first time, with own coat of arms.

Sights
The Church of Saint Vitus was built in the Baroque style in 1730. It has a separate wooden bell tower.

The Church of Saint Wenceslaus in Hrbokov was built in 1920–1922 on the site of a demolished Empire style church from the second half of the 19th century.

References

External links

Populated places in Chrudim District
Market towns in the Czech Republic